Chest rub, cold rub, or vapor/vapour rub is a topical medication applied to the chest, which is intended to assist with minor medical conditions that temporarily impair breathing, such as coughs and colds. Such medications are available over-the-counter in many countries. Vicks VapoRub is perhaps the most well known example.

Application
In addition to the chest it may also be applied to the neck or back, usually immediately before sleeping. Alternatively, it may be added to hot water and the vapours inhaled. There have been reports of children being badly burned by these steam-vapour treatments, when containers of boiling water have been accidentally spilled, and most producers therefore advise against it.

Ingredients
Chest rubs typically consist of a petroleum jelly-based ointment. Menthol is the most common active ingredient, but camphor and eucalyptus oil may also be present. Various fragrance compounds may be added, which are usually complementary with the strong mint-licorice odour of the menthol. Examples include: coumarin, thymol (thyme oil), limonene, cedarleaf oil and nutmeg oil.

Effectiveness
A single study of vapor rub found that it improved cough and cold symptoms more than a control in children with the common cold. Side effects included mild irritation of the skin where it was applied. The study was funded by Procter & Gamble, the owner of Vicks.

See also
 Tiger Balm

References

Ointments